Edward Harry "Mickey" Parks (February 26, 1917 – June 1987) was an American football player. He was one of nine children and his parents were James Hiram and Laura Belle Robbins Parks. He graduated from Shawnee (Oklahoma) High School in 1933. Parks played college football at the University of Oklahoma and was named All-Big 6 twice. He was drafted in the ninth round of the 1938 NFL Draft by the Washington Redskins. He played for the Washington Redskins for three years, earning All-Pro honors. He was center on the 1940 Eastern League Championship team that was defeated by the Chicago Bears, 73–0.  One of his teammates was Sammy Baugh. After serving in the military in World War II he played in the All-America Football Conference for the Chicago Rockets.

References

1917 births
1987 deaths
American football centers
American football offensive guards
Chicago Rockets players
Oklahoma Sooners football players
Sportspeople from Shawnee, Oklahoma
Washington Redskins players
Shawnee High School (Oklahoma) alumni
American military personnel of World War II